Hazret Omar Mosque or Hazret Omar  metjidi is a mosque in Ashgabat, Turkmenistan. The mosque accommodates up to 3,000 worshipers at a time and is located on Parahat-7 microdistrict.

History 
The mosque was built in accordance with the Decree of President Gurbanguly Berdimuhamedov by order of the religious organization Hoja Ahmet Ýasawy by the construction company Aga Gurluşyk.

The opening ceremony of the mosque was held on September 26, 2018.

Architecture 
Four minarets in the corners of the building rise  from the foundation.

Marble, granite, valuable wood species were used in the decoration of interior. Embossed epigraphy containing Surahs of the Qur'an occupies a separate place in the decoration of the mosque. They also adorn its white marble facades.

The prayer hall is designed for the simultaneous participation in the prayer of 3000 people. The upper tier is for women.

On the territory of the mosque there is a special building for holding sadaqah, ritual ceremonies and parking.

References

External links
 Photo of Hazret Omar Mosque
 Photo at night

2018 establishments in Turkmenistan
Mosques completed in 2018
Mosques in Turkmenistan